Brachydeutera longipes is a species of shore flies in the family Ephydridae.

Distribustion
Canada, United States, Oriental.

References

Ephydridae
Insects described in 1913
Taxa named by Friedrich Georg Hendel
Diptera of North America
Diptera of Asia